Serpil Hamdi Tüzün is a Turkish football coach who coached the Beşiktaş J.K. senior team for the 1979–80 season. Primarily a youth coach, he worked with the youth of Beşiktaş representing some of the finest names to the football stage. He also worked as a youth coach for the Turkey national youth football team, collecting a European under-18 championship gold medal in 1992, and a European under-16 championship gold medal in 1994. Tüzün worked as a youth coach in Azerbaijan as well. He worked in Ajax as an intern with Ștefan Kovács. He grew so many  football player in Beşiktaş youth team such as Sergen Yalcin, Feyyaz Ucar, Ali Guldiken, Metin Tekin.

References

Year of birth missing (living people)
Living people
Turkish football managers
Beşiktaş J.K. managers